This is a discography of music related to the American sitcom Friends.

Albums

Friends (Music from the TV Series)

Friends (Music from the TV Series) was an album released by WEA in 1995 featuring songs from the TV sitcom Friends. The songs were not originals written for the series, but were tracks either used directly in the show or "inspired" by the show. The album also featured small samples of spoken dialogue from the show's first season.

Chart position: #41 (U.S.)
RIAA certification: ?
Worldwide sales: 1 million +
Singles: "I'll Be There for You", "I Go Blind"

Friends Again

Friends Again is a 1999 soundtrack album. It is the second Friends soundtrack album.

Chart position: not charted (U.S.)
RIAA Certification:
Worldwide sales: 0.5 million
Singles: "Question Everything"

Friends: The One with All the Party Music

Friends: The One with All the Party Music is a 2004 soundtrack EP and was marketed as a 6-track CD sampler. It is the third Friends soundtrack, released after Friends Again (1999).

Chart position: not charted (U.S.)

Friends: The Ultimate Soundtrack

Friends: The Ultimate Soundtrack is a 2005 soundtrack album containing best hits and some new unreleased tracks from the show.

CD 1:

CD 2:

Friends 25th Anniversary

Friends 25th Anniversary is a soundtrack album released in 2019, containing 171 tracks with "сast performances and dialogue".

Singles

References 

1995 compilation albums
1995 soundtrack albums
1999 compilation albums
1999 soundtrack albums
2004 compilation albums
2004 soundtrack albums
2019 compilation albums
2019 soundtrack albums
Atlantic Records compilation albums
Atlantic Records soundtracks
Elektra Records compilation albums
Elektra Records soundtracks
Film and television discographies
Discography
Pop rock soundtracks
Reprise Records compilation albums
Reprise Records soundtracks
Soft rock soundtracks
Television soundtracks
Warner Records compilation albums
Warner Records soundtracks
WaterTower Music soundtracks
WaterTower Music compilation albums